Patrick Jennings (1831–1897) was an Irish-Australian politician and Premier of New South Wales.

Patrick or Pat Jennings may also refer to:
 Patrick Jennings (writer) (born 1962), American author of children's books
 Pat Jennings (born 1945), Northern Irish football goalkeeper
 Pat Jennings Jr. (born 1979), Northern Irish football goalkeeper
 W. Pat Jennings (1919–1994), American politician

See also
 Patrick Jennings Brady (born 1967), American artist